New Calvinism, also known as the Young, Restless, and Reformed Movement, is a movement within conservative Evangelicalism that reinterprets 16th-century Calvinism under contemporary values and ideologies.

History
The movement started in the 1980s, with the founding of the Council on Biblical Manhood and Womanhood in 1987 in the United States, which stresses the complementarianism between men and women (in contrast to egalitarianism, and as opposed to feminism). The teaching of covenant theology (as opposed to Wesleyanism, or Arminian theology), a rejection of dispensationalism, and a church governance by male elders are also hallmarks of the movement.

The movement gained wider publicity with a conference held in Louisville, Kentucky, in 2006, Together for the Gospel by American pastors John Piper, Mark Driscoll, Matt Chandler, Al Mohler, Mark Dever and CJ Mahaney. In March 2009, Time magazine ranked it as one of the "10 Ideas Changing the World Right Now", while questioning if "more Christians searching for security will submit their wills to the austerely demanding God of their country's infancy".

"Old" and New Calvinism 

Rooted in the historical tradition of Calvinist theology, New Calvinists are united by their common doctrine. In a Christianity Today article, Collin Hansen describes the speakers of a Christian conference:

As implied by the “New” designation, some differences have been observed between the New and Old schools. John Piper, for example, has identified what he considers to be 7 main differences between the two:
 New Calvinism is complementarian and not egalitarian.
 New Calvinism use contemporary forms of music.
 New Calvinism is popular among Baptists.
 New Calvinism is popular also among Charismatics.
 The books of Jonathan Edwards feature prominently, in addition to those of John Calvin.
 New Calvinism is engaged to using the internet and social media to communicate.
 New Calvinism includes multiculturalism.

Criticism 
R. Scott Clark, professor of church history and historical theology from Westminster Seminary California, argues that New Calvinists like Driscoll should not be called Calvinists merely because they believe in the five points of Calvinism, but rather he suggests that adherence to the Three Forms of Unity and other Reformed confessions of faith is what qualifies one a Calvinist. Specifically, he suggests that many of the New Calvinists' positions on infant baptism, covenant theology, and continuation of the gifts of the Spirit are out of step with the Reformed tradition.

J. Todd Billings, professor of Reformed Theology at Western Theological Seminary, argues that the New Calvinists "tend to obscure the fact that the Reformed tradition has a deeply catholic heritage, a Christ-centered sacramental practice and a wide-lens, kingdom vision for the Christian's vocation in the world."

Between 2012 and 2013 numerous Southern Baptist Ministers responded to New Calvinism by affirming a "Statement of the Traditional Southern Baptist Understanding". The document was originally endorsed by six former SBC presidents: Morris Chapman, Jimmy Draper, Paige Patterson, Bailey Smith, Bobby Welch, and Jerry Vines, two seminary presidents Chuck Kelley of New Orleans Baptist Theological Seminary and former SBC president and former Southwestern Baptist Theological Seminary President Paige Patterson, and five state executive directors (Jim Futral of Mississippi, David Hankins of Louisiana, Mike Procter of Alaska, John Sullivan of Florida, and Bob White of Georgia). The statement includes a Preamble and 10 articles of affirmation and denial as it relates to Christian Soteriology.

Traditional Reformed theologians criticize the selective and altered use of texts by Reformed classical authors, like Spurgeon in the publications of the New Calvinists without alerting their readers. Another criticism is that publications of the movement are sold as if they were historical Calvinists with no indication of the ideological bases of New Calvinism. Calvinist theologians also criticize hermeneutical inconsistencies with the grammatical-historical method and the Lordship salvation by works of the New Calvinists.

Notes

References

Further reading

Calvinism
21st-century social movements
21st-century Calvinism
New religious movements